The Eyes is a 2016 American crime drama film directed by Robbie Bryan, starring Nicholas Turturro, Vincent Pastore, Megan West, Ana Isabelle, Greg Davis Jr., Steven Hauck and Daniel Flaherty.

Cast
 Nicholas Turturro as Charlie
 Vincent Pastore as Harry
 Megan West as Jaclyn
 Ana Isabelle as Victoria
 Greg Davis Jr. as Robby
 Steven Hauck as Arnold
 Daniel Flaherty as Jeffrey
 Carly Steel as Cynthia

Release
The film was released on 7 April 2017.

Reception
Noel Murray of the Los Angeles Times wrote that nearly the entire film consists of "overwritten, overacted, visually inert confrontations and monologues."

The Hollywood Reporter wrote that the film sometimes feels like a "master class in bad acting" and "would be a dud even if its format hadn't been so overused recently."

References

External links
 
 

American crime drama films
2016 crime drama films